Purple House may refer to:
George E. Purple House in LaGrange, Illinois
Gilbert E. Purple House in Newark Valley, New York
Purple House Press, a publishing company
Purple House, a non-for-profit health organisation in Alice Springs, Australia